The Cancañiri Formation, also named as Cancañiri Tillite, is a Katian to Hirnantian geologic formation of central Bolivia. The formation is named after Cancañiri, a mining town close to Llallagua, where a local legend of a possessed woman is believed. The formation overlies the San Benito Formation in Cochabamba and the Amutara Formation in other parts. The Cancañiri Formation is overlain by the Uncía Formation.

Fossil content 
The formation has provided the following fossils:

 Destombesium pacochicoensis
 Dinorthis flabellulum
 Drabovinella curiosa
 Tunariorthis cardocanalis
 Oanduporella sp.
 Rostricellula sp.

See also 
 List of fossiliferous stratigraphic units in Bolivia

References

Bibliography

Further reading 
 V. Havlicek and L. Branisa. 1980. Ordovician brachiopods of Bolivia: Succession of assemblages, climate control, affinity to Anglo-French and Bohemian provinces. Rozpravy Ceskoslovenske Akademie Ved. Rada Matematickych a Prirodnich Ved. Academia Praha, Prague, Czechoslovakia 90(1):1-54

Geologic formations of Bolivia
Ordovician System of South America
Silurian System of South America
Ordovician Bolivia
Silurian Bolivia
Katian
Hirnantian
Sandstone formations
Shale formations
Siltstone formations
Glacial deposits
Deep marine deposits
Turbidite deposits
Ordovician southern paleotemperate deposits
Silurian southern paleotemperate deposits
Paleontology in Bolivia
Geology of Cochabamba Department
Geology of Potosí Department